Swineyard Hall is a moated country house in the parish of High Legh, Cheshire, England.  It was built in the 16th century, with additions made in the 19th century, and is still partly moated.  The house is constructed partly in timber framing with rendered brick infill, and partly in stone on a brick plinth.  The house has two storeys and an H-shaped plan.  The left hand wing of the entrance front is timber-framed, and includes close studding.  The house is recorded in the National Heritage List for England as a designated Grade II* listed building.  The moated site on which the house stands is a Scheduled Monument.

See also

Grade II* listed buildings in Cheshire East

References

Houses completed in the 16th century
Country houses in Cheshire
Timber framed buildings in Cheshire
Grade II* listed buildings in Cheshire
Scheduled monuments in Cheshire